Hisaaki Nakamine (born November 30, 1961 in Shibetsu, Hokkaido, Japan) is a Japanese curler, a two-time  (1992, 1996, 1997) and a three-time Japan men's champion (1997, 1998, 1999).

He played for Japan at the 1998 Winter Olympics, where the Japanese team finished in fifth place.

Teams

References

External links
 
Nagano 1998 - Official Report Vol. 3 (web archive; "Curling" chapter starts at page 236)
Hisaaki Nakamine - Curling - Nihon Olympic Iinkai (Japanese Olympic Committee - JOC)

Living people
1961 births
Sportspeople from Hokkaido
Japanese male curlers
Japanese curling champions
Curlers at the 1998 Winter Olympics
Olympic curlers of Japan